"Rendezvous" is as song by British singer Craig David. It was released in 19 March 2001 as the fourth and final single from his debut studio album, Born to Do It, and became his fifth top ten hit from the album, following "Rewind", "Fill Me In", "7 Days" and "Walking Away".

Chart performance
The single reached number eight on the UK Singles Chart, spending 10 weeks inside the top 75.

Music video
The music video was directed by Max & Dania.

There are two Craig David's in this video. The first one shown is the slick, ladies man. The other one is humble, trustworthy, and spends time with his parents and only admires one girl. They both go to a club, where the first Craig is hitting on all the girls, while the other Craig is with his one and only girl. Towards the end, the first Craig tries to hit on the other Craig's girlfriend, but the other Craig brushes him off and wins back his girlfriend.

Track listings
CD 1
 "Rendezvous" (Radio Edit)
 "Walking Away" (Live in Amsterdam)
 "No More" (featuring Guru)

CD 2
 "Rendezvous" (Radio Edit)
 "Rendezvous" (Blacksmith R&B Rerub) (featuring Know ?)
 "Rendezvous" (Sunship vs. Chunky Remix Edit)
 "Rendezvous" (Treats Remix)

Charts

Weekly charts

Year-end charts

Certifications

References

Craig David songs
2000 songs
2001 singles
Contemporary R&B ballads
Music videos directed by Max & Dania
Songs written by Craig David